Racer X may refer to:
Racer X (band), a Los Angeles-based heavy metal band
Racer X (Speed Racer character), a character from the 1960s Japanese anime Speed Racer
Racer-X, a 1984 EP by Big Black